Pålsundet is a strait (sund) in Stockholm, Sweden.

Geography of Stockholm County